McGee Creek is an unincorporated community and census-designated place (CDP) in Mono County, California, United States.

Geography
McGee Creek is in southwestern Mono County, sitting at the eastern base of the Sierra Nevada. U.S. Route 395 forms the northeast border of the community, leading northwest  to Mammoth Lakes and southeast  to Bishop. The CDP is named for McGee Creek, which flows out of the Sierra Nevada having risen at the McGee Lakes northeast of Red and White Mountain.

Demographics
The 2010 United States Census reported that McGee Creek had a population of 41. The population density was 10.2 people per square mile (3.9/km). The racial makeup of McGee Creek was 39 (95.1%) White, 0 (0.0%) African American, 0 (0.0%) Native American, 0 (0.0%) Asian, 0 (0.0%) Pacific Islander, 0 (0.0%) from other races, and 2 (4.9%) from two or more races.  Hispanic or Latino of any race were 2 persons (4.9%).

The Census reported that 41 people (100% of the population) lived in households, 0 (0%) lived in non-institutionalized group quarters, and 0 (0%) were institutionalized.

There were 21 households, out of which 4 (19.0%) had children under the age of 18 living in them, 8 (38.1%) were opposite-sex married couples living together, 1 (4.8%) had a female householder with no husband present, 1 (4.8%) had a male householder with no wife present.  There were 3 (14.3%) unmarried opposite-sex partnerships, and 0 (0%) same-sex married couples or partnerships. 9 households (42.9%) were made up of individuals, and 5 (23.8%) had someone living alone who was 65 years of age or older. The average household size was 1.95.  There were 10 families (47.6% of all households); the average family size was 2.50.

The population was spread out, with 7 people (17.1%) under the age of 18, 1 people (2.4%) aged 18 to 24, 6 people (14.6%) aged 25 to 44, 13 people (31.7%) aged 45 to 64, and 14 people (34.1%) who were 65 years of age or older.  The median age was 54.8 years. For every 100 females, there were 105.0 males.  For every 100 females age 18 and over, there were 126.7 males.

There were 30 housing units at an average density of 7.5 per square mile (2.9/km), of which 20 (95.2%) were owner-occupied, and 1 (4.8%) were occupied by renters. The homeowner vacancy rate was 0%; the rental vacancy rate was 0%.  40 people (97.6% of the population) lived in owner-occupied housing units and 1 people (2.4%) lived in rental housing units.

References

Census-designated places in Mono County, California
Census-designated places in California